Rąbież may refer to the following places:
Rąbież, Ciechanów County in Masovian Voivodeship (east-central Poland)
Rąbież, Płońsk County in Masovian Voivodeship (east-central Poland)
Rąbież, Gmina Korytnica in Masovian Voivodeship (east-central Poland)
Rąbież, Gmina Wierzbno in Masovian Voivodeship (east-central Poland)